Homes are living spaces used as permanent or semi-permanent residences.

Homes or HOMES may also refer to:

Colloquialisms 
 HOMES, mnemonic for names of North American Great Lakes
Project homes, communities built as public housing projects

People 
 A. M. Homes (born 1961), American writer
 Christopher Homes, physicist and eponym of Homes's law
 Henry A. Homes (1812–1887), librarian, diplomat, and missionary

Other uses 
 Homes.com, real estate portal
 "Homes", an episode of television series Zoboomafoo

See also 
Homes & Gardens magazine, AKA Better Homes and Gardens
Home (disambiguation)
Holmes (disambiguation)
Homing (disambiguation)